Vincent Michael Rizzotto (September 9, 1931 – January 17, 2021) was an American prelate of the Roman Catholic Church. Rizzotto served as an auxiliary bishop of the Archdiocese of Galveston-Houston from 2001 to 2006.

Biography

Early life 
Born in Houston, Texas, Vincent Rizzotto graduated from St. Thomas High School in Houston in 1949, and then studied at St. Mary Seminary in Houston.

Priesthood 
Rizzotto was ordained to the priesthood for the Archdiocese of Galveston-Houston on May 26, 1956. After his ordination, Rizzotto went to Washington, D.C. to study at the Catholic University of America, obtaining a Licentiate of Canon Law in 1963. He served as an official of the diocesan marriage tribunal from 1967 to 1972, and as pastor of All Saints Parish in Houston from 1969 to 1972. 

Rizzotto was appointed pastor of St. Francis de Sales Parish in Houston in 1972, serving there for the next ten years. He was raised to the rank of Monsignor on September 14, 1978. Rizzotto left St. Francis in 1982 to become pastor of St. Cecilia Parish in Hedwig Village, Texas, remaining there until 2002.  He also became a protonotary apostolic on February 16, 2000 and served as vicar general of the archdiocese.

Auxiliary Bishop of Galveston-Houston 
On June 22, 2001, Rizzotto was appointed as auxiliary bishop of the Diocese of Galveston-Houston and Titular Bishop of Lamasba by Pope John Paul II. He received his episcopal consecration on July 31 2001 at Saint Michael's Church in Houston from Archbishop Joseph Fiorenza, with Archbishop Patrick Flores and Bishop John McCarthy serving as co-consecrators. Rizzotto selected as his episcopal motto: "Make Us One In Christ."

Upon reaching the mandatory retirement age of 75, Rizzotto sent his letter of resignation as auxiliary bishop of the Archdiocese of Galvaston-Houston to Pope Benedict XVI.  The pope accepted it on November 6, 2006. Rizzotto founded the Bishop Rizzotto Golf Classic, which benefits the elderly residents of the archdiocese senior care community. 

Rizzotto died on January 17, 2021, at the age of 89m in Houston.

See also
 

 Catholic Church hierarchy
 Catholic Church in the United States
 Historical list of the Catholic bishops of the United States
 List of Catholic bishops of the United States
 Lists of patriarchs, archbishops, and bishops

References

External links
Roman Catholic Archdiocese of Galveston–Houston Official Site

Episcopal succession

1931 births
2021 deaths
Clergy from Houston
21st-century Roman Catholic bishops in the United States
Catholic University of America alumni
St. Thomas High School (Houston, Texas) alumni
Catholics from Texas